The Gulf of Alexandretta or İskenderun is a gulf of the eastern Mediterranean or Levantine Sea. It lies beside the southern Turkish provinces of Adana and Hatay.

Names
The gulf is named for the nearby Turkish city of İskenderun, the classical Alexandretta.
In IX-XII centuries the gulf was known as the Armenian Gulf or the Armenian Bay.

Geography
The Gulf of Alexandretta forms the easternmost bay or inlet of the Mediterranean Sea. It lies beside the southern coast of Turkey, near its border with Syria. In antiquity, the adjacent Nur Mountains were usually thought to separate the regions of Cilicia and Syria, although Herodotus at one point places the division further south at Ras al-Bassit (the classical Posidium).

Pollution
There is a lot of heavy industry around Iskenderun Bay, including  five cement factories, ten steel factories, and three coal-fired power stations: İsken Sugözü, Atlas and Emba Hunutlu. The mountains around the bay trap air pollution, but because smokestack details are sent to the government unpublished, it is difficult to apportion responsibility for deaths and illnesses caused by air pollution in the area. The water too is polluted by land-based, shipping and fish farming activities.

See also
 Çukurova, the modern equivalent to Cilicia
 List of gulfs

References

Citations

Bibliography
 .

Landforms of Hatay Province
Landforms of Adana Province
Alexandretta
Alexandretta